Jean Elizabeth Williams (January 20, 1876 – July 1965) is a composer who was born in Wednesbury, England, and moved to Toronto, Canada. After graduating from the Royal Conservatory of Music of the University of Toronto, she returned to England and studied to be a concert pianist.

Williams changed her career plans from performance to teaching after breaking her wrist. She returned to the University of Toronto to teach voice and piano. She later taught in Cleveland, Ohio, and St. Louis, Missouri, before moving to Portland, Oregon, in 1932.

Williams served as president of the National Music Teachers Association and as president of Mu Phi Epsilon, a professional music fraternity. She collaborated on two music education books with Nellie Tholen, who later donated Williams' papers to the University of Oregon, where they are archived.

Williams' compositions include:

Chamber 

Gavotte (violin and piano)
Valse (violin and piano)

Orchestra 

Concertina for Piano and String Orchestra
Junior Piano Concerto No. 6
Piano Concerto in a minor
Piano Concerto in C
Piano Concerto in F Major
(Second) Piano Concerto in C

Piano 

Bolero (for two pianos)
Dresden China Figures (Minuet V)
Fairy Piper
Gavotte in G Major
Partita
Polka
Prelude Funebre
Red Bird Singing
Scherzo in a minor
Sicilienne
Sonatina in G
Tango in c minor
Toccata
Valse Chanson
Valse in d minor
Zwei Canzonen aus dem Fiori Musicale

Piano or vocal (unspecified) 

Adeste Fideles (transcription)
Allegro a la Tarantella
Aria
Baby Moon
Bells
Boys Are Marching
Cherry Ripe
Christmas Music for Treble Voices
Crossing the Bar
Dance Johnny!
Dance of the Puppets
Dance with Me
Danza Espagnola
Do You Sleep?
Doll's Wedding
Fife and Drum
Fireside Memories
Flying Leaf
Four Christmas Songs
Four O' Clock in the Morning
Fun in China
Grandfather Clock
Happy Dreams
Heritage
Hermit Thrush
In Far Places
In Old Algiers
Indian Lullaby
Indian Tales
Little Irish Donkey
Lord Christ the Carpenter
Lord, Thou Hast Been Our Dwelling Place
Lovely Senorita
Low Tide
Musical Snuff Box
Negro Lullaby
Noel
Old Spinet
Painted Fan
Paisley Shawl
Pastourelle Pensif
Patriot's Song
Rain! Rain!
Resurrection
Ring, Ring Ye Bells (for women's chorus and piano; first verse by Jean Williams, second verse by Alfred Lord Tennyson)
Ring Out Wild Bells
The Roaming Bumble Bee
Scout March
Simple Simon
Sleep Holy Child
Slumber Little One
Slumber Song
Snow by Night
Soldiers down the Street
Star of My Heart
Strange Port
Street Parade
These Are They
This is Oregon
To a Winter Robin
Toby Jug
Train
Vin et les Cloches
Wind and the Waves
Wind Chimes and Lanterns
Wind in the Night
Winter Sleep

References 

British women composers
1876 births
1965 deaths
University of Toronto alumni
People from Wednesbury
Canadian women composers
British emigrants to Canada